James Alexander Campbell (1 July 1858 – 19 June 1902) was a Scotland international rugby union player.

Rugby Union career

Amateur career

Campbell attended Merchiston Castle School, which he was attending when capped in 1878.

For his final three internationals he was playing club rugby for Glasgow Academicals.

Provincial career

He was capped by Glasgow District for the inter-city match against Edinburgh District on 4 December 1880.

He was capped by West of Scotland District for their match against East of Scotland District on 5 February 1881.

International career

He made his debut for Scotland in 1878 at the young age of 19.

He was capped for Scotland between 1878 and 1881, and he was amongst the youngest player ever to be capped for Scotland – he was nearly twenty years old when he was capped against  on 4 March 1878.

He earned a total of 5 caps for Scotland.

References

Sources

 Bath, Richard (ed.) The Scotland Rugby Miscellany (Vision Sports Publishing Ltd, 2007 )

1858 births
1902 deaths
Canadian rugby union players
Scotland international rugby union players
Sportspeople from Alberta
People educated at Merchiston Castle School
Merchistonian FC players
Canadian people of Scottish descent
Scottish rugby union players
Glasgow Academicals rugby union players
West of Scotland District (rugby union) players
Glasgow District (rugby union) players